The Federal Farm Credit Banks Funding Corporation (FFCBFC) based in Jersey City, New Jersey is an entity within the Farm Credit System (FCS) that manages and coordinates the sale of system-wide bonds and notes in the national financial markets. Since the FCS, by law, is not permitted to accept customer deposits, these bonds and notes are the FCS’s primary source of loanable funds.

References

External links
Official website

United States Department of Agriculture agencies
Financial services companies based in New Jersey
Agricultural finance